In music theory, a nondominant seventh chord is both a diatonic chord and a seventh chord, but it does not possess dominant function, and thus it is not a dominant seventh chord.

Since the V and vii chords are the dominant function chords, the "major minor seventh" V7 and "half-diminished seventh" vii7 are the dominant seventh chords. Since the nondominant function chords are I, i, ii, ii, iii, III, IV, iv, vi, and VI, the nondominant seventh chord qualities include the augmented major seventh chord, major seventh chord, minor major seventh chord, minor seventh chord, and major minor seventh chords that do not possess dominant function, such as, in melodic minor, IV.

With chord letters used to indicate the root and chord quality, and add 7, thus a seventh chord on ii in C major (minor minor seventh) would be d7.

As with dominant seventh chords, nondominant seventh chords usually progress according to the circle progression, thus III+ resolves to vi or VI, for example.

When possible, as in circle progressions, resolve the seventh of nondominant seventh chords down by step to the third of the following chord.

See also
Irregular resolution
Diminished seventh chord (vii7 in harmonic minor)
Dominant ninth, etc.
Dominant seventh flat five chord (V75)

References

Seventh chords